Gazakh-Tovuz Economic Region is one of the 14 economic regions of Azerbaijan. It borders Georgia to the north and Armenia to the south and west, and Ganja-Dashkasan Economic Region to the east. The region consists of the districts of Aghstafa, Gadabay, Gazakh, Shamkir, and Tovuz. Its population was estimated to be at 687.6 thousand people in January 2021.

History 
Gazakh-Tovuz Economic Region was established on 7 July 2021 as part of a reform of the economic region system of Azerbaijan. Its territory was part of the larger Ganja-Qazakh Economic Region prior to 2021.

References 

Economic regions of Azerbaijan